Breckbill Bible College is a fundamental, Protestant college founded in 1957 by William Wallace Breckbill. It is located in Max Meadows, Virginia. The college offers majors in Bible, Pastoral Ministries, Family and Women's Ministries, Youth Ministries, Christian Education and Missions. The college is owned and operated by the Evangelical Methodist Church of America, headquartered in Kingsport, Tennessee but individuals from other Bible-believing denominations are welcome. Breckbill offers undergrad, graduate and independent study programs.

References

External links

Methodist universities and colleges in the United States
Educational institutions established in 1957
1957 establishments in Virginia
Education in Wythe County, Virginia